The European Running Target Championships are special shooting sport championships of running target organized discontinuously by the International Shooting Sport Federation (ISSF) since 1963.

Until 1983 competitions were held by shooting to moving targets made up of animals, such as deer, roebucks or wild boars; since 1983, the animals have been replaced with artificial targets.

Editions
 6 Edition (1978, 1995, 1997, 2013, 2014, 2018) of shotgun and running target was held simultaneously.

Special Running Target Championships
 6 Edition (1978, 1995, 1997, 2013, 2014, 2018) of shotgun and running target was held simultaneously.

See also
 Running target shooting
 International Shooting Sport Federation
 ISSF European Shooting Championships

References

External links
 
 European Champion Archive Results at Sport-komplett-de

 
European
Shooting sports in Europe by country